Hasan Khaled Abu Al-Huda  (1870 – 1936) was a politician who served as the 4th Prime Minister of Transjordan twice in 1923–24 and 1926–1931. He was Minister of Finance from 1924 to 1926.

Family and early life
Hasan Khaled was the son of Muhammad bin Hasan Wadi, an official of the Ottoman Empire, nicknamed "al-Sayyid Abul Huda" and "al-Sayyadi", from Khan Shaykhun, Syria, who claimed to descend from a local saint. Hasan Khaled's father was the leader of the Rifaʽi sect of Sufiism, Naqib (Chief Sherif) of Aleppo, and religious adviser of Sultan Abdulhamid II on Arab affairs. Hasan Khaled spent most of his childhood in Istanbul, where his family resided. He married an Egyptian of Turkish origins, Devlet Abu Gabal, with whom he had two daughters, Velia Abdel-Huda (1916-2012), an Oxford-educated socialite and art historian, and Halime Lima Hanımefendi (1919-2000), who married Şehzade Mehmed Nazım, the son of Şehzade Mehmed Ziyaeddin; and a son, Taj al-Din, who, like his grandfather, had been more religiously inclined and was appointed as president of the Aleppan Ashraf in 1942.

Following the Young Turk Revolution, Hasan Khaled is said to have escaped Istanbul to Paris, where he funded himself using the proceeds of a company which he sold. Later, he moved to Alexandria to reside with family. For a time, he resided in the house of Hussein al-Qasab. During this period, he is said to have intrigued with al-Qasab and other Arab nationalists.

Foreign honours
 :
 Honorary Commander of the Order of the British Empire

See also
 Politics of Jordan

References

1870s births
1948 deaths
Prime Ministers of Jordan
Finance ministers of Jordan
Government ministers of Jordan